Ar Cànan, Ar Ceòl, Ar-A-Mach ("Our Language, Our Music, Rebellion") is an anarcho-punk album, by the band Oi Polloi. It was released in 2006 by the band on CD, and on vinyl in 2007. This was the first full-length rock LP sung entirely in Gaelic since Runrig released their Play Gaelic LP in 1979.

Track listing 
 "Ar Ceòl 's Ar Cànan"
 "Brosnachadh Catha"
 "Ramalair Rùisgte"
 "Ceud Mìle Fàilte"
 "Là na Sabaid"
 "Daibhidh Sneddon"
 "Sgrùdadh 2323"
 "Bas dhan t-Siostam"
 "Union Jack? Thall 's Cac!"
 "Fear a' Bhàta"
 "Càit a Bheil an Armachd Lèir-Sgrios?"
 "9-11"
 "Coin-Chaorach is Madaidhean-Allaidh"
 "SS Politician"

2006 albums
Oi Polloi albums